The Argentine angelshark (Squatina argentina) is an angelshark of the family Squatinidae.

Measurements
Born: N/A.; Mature: ~ 100.0 cm - 120 cm TL; Max: 138 (?170) cm TL.

Identification
Colour: Are a purplish-brown color with many scattered dark brown spots (with no white), that are mostly in circular groups around a central spot. No ocelli. Obtains paler dorsal fins. Body: Has simple spatulate nasal barbels. Also slightly fringed or a smooth anterior nasal flaps with no triangular lobes on lateral head folds. Has concave between its eyes. Obtains enlarged thorns on snout, and not back. Its pectoral fins are large, broad, and obtusely angular. Convex leading edge forming a very distinct 'shoulder'.

Distribution & range
Southwest Atlantic: from southern Brazil down south to Patagonia. 19°S - 53°S, 68°W - 38°W.

Climate & habitat
Subtropical; continental shelf and upper slope, demersal, marine. Found 50 – 320 m (usually 100 – 400 m) down.

Behaviour
Unknown.

Biology
Diet: Feeds on demersal fishes, shrimp, and squid. Reproduction: Are ovoviviparous, birth about 7 to 11 pups per litter.

Threat to humans
Traumatogenic.

Resilience & vulnerability
Very low, minimum population doubling time more than 14 years; high to very high vulnerability.

References

 
 Compagno, Dando, & Fowler, Sharks of the World, Princeton University Press, New Jersey 2005 

Argentine angelshark
Fish of Argentina
Fish of Uruguay
Argentine angelshark